Abd al-Salam is a male Muslim honorific or given name, built on the Arabic words Abd, al- and Salam. The name means "servant of the All-peaceable", as-Salam being one of the names of God in the Qur'an, which give rise to the Muslim theophoric names.

Because the letter s is a sun letter, the letter l of the al- is assimilated to it. Thus although the name is written with letters corresponding to Abd al-Salam, the usual pronunciation corresponds to Abd as-Salam. Alternative transliterations include Abdul Salam, Abdul Salaam,  Abdus Salam and others, all subject to variant spacing and hyphenation.

Notable people with the name include:

People
Abd as-Salam ibn Mashish al-Alami (1140–1227), Moroccan Sufi saint
Abd As-Salam Al-Asmar (1455–1575), Libyan Muslim saint
Abdel Salam Al Nabulsy (1899–1968), Lebanese actor
Abdus Salam (editor) (1910–1977), Bangladesh journalist
Abdul-Salam Ojeili (1917–2006),  Syrian novelist and politician
Abdul Salam Arif (1921–1966), president of Iraq
Abdelsalam al-Majali (1925–2023), Prime Minister of Jordan
Abdus Salam (Bengali Language Movement demonstrator) (1925–1952), died during the Bengali Language Movement demonstrations
Abdus Salam (1926–1996), Pakistani physicist and Nobel laureate
  Abdus Salam (1925–1992), Pakistani newscaster
Belaid Abdessalam (1928–2020), Algerian politician
Rhadi Ben Abdesselam (1929–2000), Moroccan runner
Shadi Abdel Salam (1930–1986), Egyptian film director
Abdul Salam Azimi (born 1936), Chief Justice of Afghanistan
Ali Abdussalam Treki, or Ali Treki, (1937–2015), Libyan diplomat
Abdessalam Jalloud (born 1944), Prime Minister of Libya
Abdulsalami Abubakar (born 1942), Nigerian politician
Abdul Salaam (born 1953), American football player for the New York Jets
Abdussalam Puthige (born 1964), Indian journalist
Abdulsalam Abdullah (born 1965), Iraqi politician
Abd al-Salam Ali al-Hila (born 1968), a Yemeni citizen, a Guantanamo detainee ID # 1463
Abdul Salam Zaeef (born 1968), Afghan ambassador to Pakistan
Abdoul Salam Sow (born 1970), Guinean football player
Ashraf Salim Abd Al Salam Sultan (born 1971), Libyan Guantanamo detainee ID # 263
Samir Abdussalam Aboud, known as Samir Aboud (born 1972), Libyan footballer
Kamal Abdulsalam (born 1973), Libyan-Qatari bodybuilder
Abdoul Salem Thiam, known as Abdoul Thiam, (born 1976), German footballer
Abdulsalam Haykal (born 1978), Syrian entrepreneur and social activist
Abdulsalam Al Gadabi (born 1978), Yemeni swimmer
Abdeslam Ouaddou (born 1978), Moroccan footballer
Chérif Abdeslam (born 1978), Algerian footballer
Abdulsalaam Jumaa (born 1979), UAR footballer
Nader Abdussalam Al Tarhouni (born 1979), Libyan footballer
Abdessalem Arous (born 1979), Tunisian judoka
Abdeslam Akouzar (born 1982), Moroccan-French footballer
Abdul Salam Gaithan Mureef Al Shehry (born 1984), citizen of Saudi Arabia, Guantanamo detainee  ID # 132
Abdessalam Benjelloun (born 1985), Moroccan footballer
Abdusalam Abubakar (born ca. 1990), Somali-Irish scientist
Abdusalam Abas Ibrahim, full name of Abdus Ibrahim (born 1991), Ethiopian-American soccer player
Abudushalamu Abudurexiti (born 1996), (ULY: Abdusalam Abdurëshit) Chinese professional basketball player of the Uyghur ethnic group
Abdesslam Yassine, leader of Moroccan Islamist organisation Al Adl Wa Al Ihssane
Abdul Salam Sabrah, acting Prime Minister of the Yemen Arab Republic
Abdul Salam al-Buseiri, Libyan Foreign Minister
Mohamed Abd ElSalam Mahgoub, Egyptian politician
Abdeslam Ahizoune, Moroccan businessman
Abdul Salam Mumuni, Ghanaian film maker
Abdeslam Boulaich, Moroccan story-teller
Abdesalam Kames, Libyan footballer
Mehdat Abdul Salam Shabana, director of Konsojaya Trading Company, alleged terrorist front organization based in Kuala Lumpur
Moulvi Abdus Salam (1906–1999), Bangladeshi politician
Abdul Salaam Alizai, former member of the Taliban who defected to the government in 2007
Abdul Salam (Taliban Chief Justice), Chief Justice of the Taliban's Supreme Court
Abdul Salam Rocketi, Taliban commander who shot down a Soviet helicopter with a rocket propelled grenade, and who ran for office in 2005
Ibrahim Abdeslam, one of the perpetrators of the November 2015 Paris attacks
Salah Abdeslam, Belgian-born French terrorism suspect in the November 2015 Paris attacks
Abdul Salam Hanafi, Taliban leader

See also
Abdul
Salaam (disambiguation)

References

Arabic masculine given names